The Government College of Arts, Chandigarh is an art institute in Chandigarh, India. Established in 1951 by SL Prashar, it offers professional education in art to students from over 68 years. This institute is one among the first three art institutions of India. It has a history of almost  132 years, initially, it was initially established as Mayo School of Industrial art in 1875 for purpose to provide industrial drawing as the world was on industrial revolution. John Lockwood Kipling was appointed as the first principal of the institution, which is now active as National College of Arts in Lahore. It came up on 16 August 1951 as splinter Mayo School of Arts, Lahore in Pakistan after Partition of India. In 1951 it was first established as Government School of Art and craft at Shimla, the capital of Punjab and subsequently Govt. College of art and craft, Chandigarh. On re-organization of Punjab, the control came under Chandigarh Administration. This institution is situated in Sector 10 C, adjoining the Government Museum and Art Gallery, Chandigarh.

History
Government College of Art, Chandigarh the Institution is recognised as Mayo School's post-colonial cousins in India. Primarily it was set up by the British on the name of Mayo School of Art, at Lahore (now in Pakistan) in the year 1875. After the partition of the country, it was re-organized upon the prototype of Mayo School, as Government school of art and craft, at Shimla on 16 August 1951. The syllabus was modelled on the pattern of the Lahore school. Initially, it was put under the administrative control of Director of Industries and Industrial Training, Punjab.

In 1962, when Chandigarh came up as the new Capital of Punjab, the school of Art was shifted to its current location. Adjoining is the Government Museum and Art Gallery Chandigarh. The campus has been designed as a composite Cultural Complex by the French-Swiss architect Le Corbusier. The first principal and founder of this college in Chandigarh was S. L. Prashar.

Campus 
Dhanraj Bhagat Sculpture park in the College campus, was set up on 15 October 2010, that became an open-air workshop for the students to work in open classroom and an option to recover from the constraint of time and space of regular college routine, as a result, it came up with a permanent exhibition of artworks in the institution. S L Prashar Art Gallery was inaugurated on 16 June 2012, and the first exhibition with old photographs dating back to 1951 on diamond jubilee of the institution.

Courses

Government College of Art, Chandigarh offers a graduate and a postgraduate degree in four main branches, namely, Painting, Sculpture, Print Making and Applied Art. Since the year 2002, The college has instituted another full-time diploma course of 4 years duration and special diploma course of 2 years duration since 2012 for deaf and Mute/Mentally Challenged students in Fine Arts (all the four disciplines)

Notable alumni
Satish Gujral
Sohan Qadri
Avtarjeet Singh Dhanjal 
Shiv Singh
Sidharth (artist)
Diwan Manna
Thukral & Tagra
Vibha Galhotra
D. S. Kapoor
R. M. Singh
Gurpreet Singh Dhuri
Manjot Kaur
Randeep Maddoke
DrJogender Pal Singh

References 

1951 establishments in East Punjab
Art schools in India
Partition of India
Punjabi artists